The Pietenpol Sky Scout is a parasol wing homebuilt aircraft designed by Bernard H. Pietenpol.

Development
The Sky Scout was a lower cost follow-on to the Pietenpol's first homebuilt design, the Pietenpol Air Camper. Using a lower cost Ford Model T engine, rather than the more current Ford Model A engine of the time. The aircraft was redesigned for the heavier, lower power engine by reducing it to a single person aircraft. The new pilot location required a section called a "flop" to be installed, essentially a section of the wing that was hinged up to allow the pilot to stand up when getting into and out of the aircraft.

The aircraft was designed to be built of spruce and plywood. The drawings were published in the 1933 Mechanix Illustrated magazine.

On display
 A Sky Scout is on display at the Pioneer Flight Museum in Kingsbury, Texas.  This Scout is powered by a Model A engine.  It is intended to be a flyable aircraft but for the present is only occasionally run up.   The number one Pietenpol with a Model T engine can be found at the Model T Ford Club of America Model T Museum in Richmond, Indiana.
 Sky Scout N1933A on display at Western Antique Aeroplane & Automobile Museum
 Also one on display at Fountain, Minnesota Historical Center which is just 15 miles from B Pietenpol's home town of Cherry Grove. Bernard Pietenpol is also buried in Fountain.

Variants
Claude Sessions developed a finned head modification on his Sky Scout for lighter weight air-cooling. The engine was featured in Modern Mechanics magazine in 1931 and formed the basis for the American Flea Corporation Universal 50-60 engine.
Pietenpol Air Camper

Specifications (Pietenpol Sky Scout)

See also

References

External links 
 Pietenpol family site

1930s United States civil utility aircraft
Homebuilt aircraft
Single-engined tractor aircraft
Parasol-wing aircraft
Aircraft first flown in 1933